King Charles may refer to:

Kings
A number of kings of Albania, Alençon, Anjou, Austria, Bohemia, Croatia, England, France, Holy Roman Empire, Hungary, Ireland, Jerusalem, Naples, Navarre, Norway, Portugal, Romania, Sardinia, Scotland, Sicily, Spain, Sweden and West Francia (as well as various dukes etc.):

Other
 Two related but distinct breeds of dog, associated with King Charles II of England:
 King Charles Spaniel
 Cavalier King Charles Spaniel
 King Charles (musician) (born 1985), singer-songwriter 
 King Charles (film), a 1913 British silent historical film about Charles II of England

See also 

 Charles King (disambiguation)
 Charles Rex (disambiguation), "Charles the King" in Latin, as used in some forms of address in English
 Carolus Rex (disambiguation), "King Charles" in its latinate form, as used in some formal documents in English 
 Prince Charles (disambiguation)
 Lord Charles (disambiguation)
 Sir Charles (disambiguation)
 Charles (disambiguation)